Andrew Duncan may refer to:

Andrew Duncan (minister, died 1626) (c. 1560–1626), Scottish minister
Andrew Duncan (physician, born 1744) (1744–1828), Scottish pioneer for improved institutional care and treatment of mental health problems, founder of Royal Edinburgh Hospital
Andrew Duncan (minister, born 1766) (1766–1827), Moderator of the Church of Scotland in 1824
Andrew Duncan (physician, born 1773) (1773–1832), Scottish physician and professor at the University of Edinburgh
Andrew Duncan (mayor) (1834–1880), third mayor of Christchurch, New Zealand
Sir Andrew Duncan (businessman) (1882–1952), British businessman, MP and public official
Andrew Duncan (poet) (born 1956), British poet
Andrew Duncan (rugby league) (born 1972), British rugby league footballer
Andrew Duncan (director), Canadian television director and writer

See also
Andy Duncan (disambiguation)